The 2011 W-League grand final was the grand final of the third season of the Australian W-League football (soccer) competition. It was contested between premiers Sydney FC and second-placed Brisbane Roar at Campbelltown Stadium in Campbelltown on Saturday, 12 February 2011. Brisbane Roar were victorious, winning 2–1.

Match details

See also
List of W-League champions

References

External links

Grand
Soccer in Sydney
A-League Women Grand Finals